Francis John Carter (13 December 1869 – 3 January 1949) was a New Zealand sawmiller. He was born in Moutoa, Manawatu/Horowhenua, New Zealand.

In 2000, Carter was posthumously inducted into the New Zealand Business Hall of Fame.

References 

1869 births
1949 deaths
New Zealand sawmillers